The list of ship launches in 1852 includes a chronological list of ships launched in 1852.  In cases where no official launching ceremony was held, the date built or completed may be used instead.



References

1852
Ship launches
 Ship launches